William J. Klish is a Professor Emeritus of Pediatrics, Gastroenterology, Hepatology and Nutrition at Baylor College of Medicine. Klish was educated at the University of Wisconsin–Eau Claire and the University of Wisconsin–Madison. Klish is a past president of the North American Society for Pediatric Gastroenterology and Nutrition. He currently directs the obesity center at the Texas Children's Hospital that he developed. Klish is credited with having helped develop pediatric gastroenterology as a field, and he has won numerous awards for his work. He was the first person to be credentialed in pediatric gastroenterology by the American Board of Pediatrics. Klish played a role in the popular documentary Super Size Me created by Morgan Spurlock, monitoring Spurlock's health as he binged on fast food.

References

Living people
American gastroenterologists
American hepatologists
American pediatricians
University of Wisconsin–Eau Claire alumni
University of Wisconsin School of Medicine and Public Health alumni
Baylor College of Medicine faculty
Year of birth missing (living people)